A Mind to Murder (1963) is a crime novel by P. D. James, the second in her Adam Dalgliesh series.

Synopsis
In a psychiatric clinic late one night, the piercing scream of a dying woman shatters the calm, and Detective Superintendent Dalgliesh is called away from his literary soiree to investigate. He soon finds the body of a clinic employee sprawled across the cold basement floor, a chisel driven mercilessly through her heart; and so marks the beginning of a deadly psychological battle with an intellectual, predatory killer who feels no remorse, no regret and no self-control over darker impulses...

Reception
"With discernment, depth and craftsmanship, A Mind to Murder is a superbly satisfying mystery." - Chicago Daily News

External links

References

1963 British novels
Novels by P. D. James
Faber and Faber books
British detective novels